Colin Wexford Latimour (11 December 1946 – 24 December 2014) was an association football player who represented New Zealand at international level.

Latimour played for Auckland Grammar School first XI and was the teams vice captain. While playing for the school, he was selected for the Auckland under-21 side.

Latimour made his full All Whites début in a 3–5 loss to Australia on 5 November 1967 and ended his international playing career with 20 A-international caps to his credit, his final cap gained in a 0–4 loss to Iraq on 24 March 1973. Latimour scored a single international goal in a 2–1 win over New Caledonia on 21 February 1973.

Colin Latimour was New Zealand Soccer Player of the Year in 1967.

References

External links

1946 births
2014 deaths
Sportspeople from Yangon
New Zealand association footballers
New Zealand international footballers
Association football defenders
1973 Oceania Cup players